Alagyaz is a village in the Alagyaz Municipality of the Aragatsotn Province of Armenia. Most of the population are Yazidis and Kurds.

External links

Notes 

Populated places in Aragatsotn Province
Yazidi villages
Kurdish settlements in Armenia
Yazidi populated places in Armenia